Blixt is a surname. Notable people with the surname include:

Anders Blixt (born 1959), Swedish game designer and journalist
David Blixt (born 1973), American author, actor, and director
Jonas Blixt (born 1984), Swedish golfer
Lars Blixt (born 1976), Norwegian footballer
Liselott Blixt (born 1965), Swedish-Danish politician